Robert J. Schwalb is a writer in the role-playing game industry, and has worked as a game designer and developer for such games as Dungeons & Dragons, A Song of Ice and Fire Roleplaying, Warhammer Fantasy Roleplay, and many other RPG supplements.

Career
Robert J. Schwalb has worked for Wizards of the Coast. His works for Dungeons & Dragons include: Fiendish Codex II: Tyrants of the Nine Hells (2006, with Robin Laws), Drow of the Underdark (2007, with Ari Marmell, Anthony Pryor, and Greg A. Vaughan), Elder Evils (2007), Exemplars of Evil (2007), Tome of Magic (2006, with Matthew Sernett, Dave Noonan, and Ari Marmell), Player's Handbook II (2006).

He has also worked for Green Ronin Publishing on Warhammer Fantasy Roleplay, and he has contributed to Witch Hunter: The Invisible World for Paradigm Concepts (2007).

Schwalb was a long-time developer and staff member for Green Ronin. With Patrick O'Duffy and Chris Pramas, Schwalb wrote The Pirate's Guide to Freeport (2007), a 256-page sourcebook on Green Ronin's best-known locale. Schwalb designed the A Song of Ice and Fire Roleplaying game, which previewed in 2008 and published in 2009; this was his last project for Green Ronin before he moved over to Wizards of the Coast. His additional role-playing work includes work for Black Industries, Fantasy Flight Games, and several other companies.

Schwalb became the writer for the online version of the popular Dragon column "Demonomicon of Iggwilv" in 2008, having thus far contributed articles for Yeenoghu and Baphomet.

Schwalb also co-wrote Divine Power, a 4th Edition D&D supplement, which made the Wall Street Journal Best-Seller list for July 2009.

In 2012, Schwalb became one of the lead designers for the fifth edition of Dungeons & Dragons. He also wrote for Monte Cook Games' Numenera line, including the Numenera Character Options book and the adventure Beyond All Worlds.

In 2014, after completing his work on the fifth edition, Schwalb launched Schwalb Entertainment and began writing a new RPG entitled Shadow of the Demon Lord.

In 2018, Schwalb contributed to the new Judge Dredd role-playing game, Judge Dredd & The Worlds of 2000 AD, by EN World's EN Publishing.

Dragon and Dungeon magazine articles
Schwalb, Robert J. "Elder Evils: Shothragot." Dragon #362. Renton, WA: Wizards of the Coast, 2008. Available online: 
-----. "The Essence of Evil." Dungeon #152. Renton, WA: Wizards of the Coast, 2007. Available online: 
-----. "Infernal Aristocracy: Dukes of Hell." Dragon #360. Renton, WA: Wizards of the Coast, 2007. Available online: 
-----. "Into the Maw." Dungeon #147. Bellevue, WA: Paizo Publishing, June 2007.
-----. "Lassiviren the Dark: Ruthless Assassin." Dungeon #114. Bellevue, WA: Paizo Publishing, September 2004.
-----. "Shadow of Shothragot: The Price of Survival." Renton, WA: Wizards of the Coast, 2007. Available online:

Awards
Grimm (Fantasy Flight Games), designer - 2004 Silver ENnie Award for Best d20 Game
Book of Fiends (Green Ronin Publishing), designer - 2004 Silver ENnie for Best Revision, Update or Compilation
Advanced Bestiary (Green Ronin Publishing), developer - 2005 Silver ENnie for Best Monster or Adversary Product
Black Company campaign setting (Green Ronin Publishing), designer - 2005 Silver ENnie for Best Campaign Setting or Setting Supplement
Warhammer Fantasy Roleplay (Black Industries), additional design - 2005 Gold ENnie for Best Game
Tome of Horrors 3 (Necromancer Games), additional design - 2006 Gold ENnie for Best Adversary/Monster Product
Children of the Horned Rat (Black Industries), design and development - 2007 Silver ENnie for Best Writing
Warhammer Fantasy RolePlay: Lure of the Liche Lord (Black Industries), additional design and development - 2007 Gold ENnie for Best Adventure
Elder Evils (Wizards of the Coast), lead designer - 2008 Silver ENnie for Best Monster/Adversary
Pirate's Guide to Freeport (Green Ronin Publishing), designer - 2008 Silver ENnie for Best Setting
A Song of Ice and Fire Roleplaying (Green Ronin Publishing), designer - 2009 Silver ENnie for Best Rules
Player's Handbook 3 (Wizards of the Coast), designer - 2010 Silver ENnie for Best Supplement
Song of Ice and Fire Campaign Guide - 2011 nomination for Best Games Supplement Origins award

References

External links
Robert J. Schwalb's Official Site.
Schwalb Entertainment, LLC's Official Site.

Dragon Con guest page
Wizards articles by Robert J Schwalb

Dungeons & Dragons game designers
Living people
Year of birth missing (living people)